"Light My Fire" is a song by Italian musical group Club House, featuring Italian-American singer Carl Fanini, released as the second single from their debut and only album, Nowhere Land (The Album) (1995), in August 1993. It was co-written by a number of producers at Media Records, including Gianfranco Bortolotti and Mauro Picotto, a DJ who would go on to have a number of trance hits in the 2000s, such as "Lizard" and "Komodo".

Releases
"Light My Fire" was first released as a single on 23 August 1993, charting at  45 on the United Kingdom and No. 19 in Ireland, where it is remembered as the record the original six man line-up of Boyzone danced to on RTÉ's The Late Late Show. A re-release the following year with new remixes by fellow Media Records act Cappella  saw it reach No. 11 in Ireland, and No. 26 in Australia. In the United Kingdom, Media Records had licensed the single to Pete Waterman's PWL record label (as UK Media Records would not be launched for another couple of years), with the Cappella version becoming another top 10 hit for PWL, when it peaked at No. 7 in April 24, 1994. The single was also a hit in Scandinavia and the US.

Critical reception
In August 1994, Larry Flick from Billboard remarked that the song "has already wooed folks overseas". In his weekly UK chart commentary, James Masterton noted that it "has been filling floors up and down the country". Alan Jones from Music Week gave it four out of five, describing it as a "happy Italian record in Erasure-go-house style, right down to the ersatz Andy Bell contralto." In 1993, James Hamilton from the RM Dance Update called it "catchy "hey down dippy doo day-ah" chanting reissued now much more timely smash bound scampering Italo Hi-NRG". In 1994, he deemed it an "infectious Italo Hi-NRG galloper".

Track listings
 CD single, UK (PWL Continental, 1993)
 "Light My Fire" (edit) – 3:32
 "Light My Fire" (Noisy Clouds mix) – 4:55
 "Light My Fire" (Storm in the Clouds mix) – 5:06
 "Light My Fire" (X Club cut) – 6:12
 "Light My Fire" (XX Club cut) – 5:24
 "Light My Fire" (R.A.F. Track) – 1:59

 CD single - The Cappella Remixes, UK (PWL Records 1994)
 "Light My Fire" (Cappella (R.A.F. Zone) remix edit) – 3:39
 "Light My Fire" (Cappella (KM) remix) – 6:17
 "Light My Fire" (Cappella (R.A.F. Zone) remix) – 6:07
 "Light My Fire" (DJ Professor XX dub) – 6:29
 "Light My Fire" (original 12-inch mix) – 4:54

Charts

Release history

References

1993 singles
1993 songs
1994 singles
Club House (band) songs
English-language Italian songs
Pete Waterman Entertainment singles
Songs written by Gianfranco Bortolotti